The 2009 United Bowl was the inaugural title game of the Indoor Football League (IFL). It was played on August 15, 2009, at the Rimrock Auto Arena at MetraPark in Billings, Montana. The top seed in the Intense Conference (Billings Outlaws) defeated the six-seed RiverCity Rage of the United Conference by a score of 71–62.

Road to the United Bowl

United Conference

Intense Conference

z=clinched top seed in conference, x=clinched division, y=clinched wild card spot

Game summary
The 2009 United Bowl was a highly anticipated event in both Billings and the Greater St. Louis area, as the Billings Outlaws hosted the RiverCity Rage in what would end up being the franchise's final game. RiverCity fell behind Billings quickly, as the score was 20-7 heading into the second quarter and was 34-20 at halftime. The pace stayed pretty much the same throughout the rest of the game as the Outlaws beat the Rage, 71-62, for their third franchise title.

References

2009 Indoor Football League season
American football in Montana
Sports competitions in Montana
United Bowl
2009 in sports in Montana
RiverCity Rage
Billings Outlaws
August 2009 sports events in the United States
Sports in Billings, Montana